Arhopala alea, the Kanara oakblue or rosy oakblue, is a species of lycaenid or blue butterfly. It is endemic to India. The species was first described by William Chapman Hewitson in 1862.

Description

References

Arhopala
Butterflies described in 1862
Taxa named by William Chapman Hewitson
Butterflies of Asia